The Motorsport Club of Ottawa (MCO) was created in 1949 as the Ottawa Light Car Club. It is governed by the Canadian Automobile Sport Clubs - Ontario Region (CASC-OR). Club members participate in all levels of motorsports, including autocross, Solo Sprints, road and oval racing, TSD and performance rallies, karting, officiating and marshalling. Members have competed at the local, regional, national, and international level.

External links
Official website

Motorsport in Canada
Auto racing teams established in 1949
Organizations based in Ottawa
1949 establishments in Ontario